Another Story may refer to:

 Another Story (Courtney Pine album), released in 1998
 Another Story (Fiction Factory album), released in 1985
 Another Story (Stanley Turrentine album), released in 1969
 Another Story (Ernest Tubb album), released in 1967
Official Another Story Clannad: On the Hillside Path that Light Watches Over, a Japanese visual novel
Sailor Moon: Another Story, a video game released in 1995
 Another Story (Festival), annual literary event, taking place in Skopje, Republic of Macedonia